Padma Sachdev (17 April 1940 – 4 August 2021) was an Indian poet and novelist. She was the first modern woman poet of the Dogri language. She also wrote in Hindi. She published several poetry collections, including Meri Kavita Mere Geet (My Poems, My Songs), which won the Sahitya Akademi Award in 1971. She also received the Padma Shri, India's fourth highest civilian award in 2001, and the Kabir Samman for poetry for the year 2007-08 given by Government of Madhya Pradesh, Saraswati Samman for the year 2015, Sahitya Akademi Fellowship in 2019.

Personal life and death
Sachdev was born in a Khatri Family in Purmandal, Jammu on 17 April 1940. She was the eldest of three children of a Sanskrit scholar, professor Jai Dev Badu, who was later killed during the partition of India in 1947. She first married Vedpal Deep and later married singer Surinder Singh of the musical duo "Singh Bandhu" in 1966. She and Surinder Singh first lived in New Delhi, but later shifted to Mumbai. She died on 4 August 2021 in Mumbai at the age of 81, leaving behind husband Surinder Singh and their daughter Meeta Sachdev.

Career
Sachdev worked in All India Radio, Jammu as an announcer since 1961. Here she met Surinder Singh, Hindustani vocalist of the Singh Bandhu musical duo, who was a duty officer at the time. In the following years, she also worked with All India Radio, Mumbai.

Sachdev won the Sahitya Akademi Award for her anthology Meri Kavita Mere Geet in 1969. Writing in the preface of the work, Hindi poet Ramdhari Singh Dinkar noted "After reading Padma's poems I felt I should throw my pen away  for what Padma writes is true poetry." Her autobiography Boond Bawadi is considered a classic. Her book In Bin addressed the under appreciated role played by domestic helps in Indian households.

She wrote the lyrics of the song 'Mera chhota sa ghar baar' from the 1973 Hindi film by Ved Rahi "Prem Parbat" which had music by Jaidev. Thereafter, she wrote the lyrics of two songs of the 1978 Hindi film "Aankhin Dekhi", which had music by J.P. Kaushik including the famous duet "Sona re, tujhe kaise miloo" sung by Mohd Rafi and Sulakshana Pandit. She also wrote the lyrics along with Yogesh for the 1979 Hindi film "Saahas", which had music by Ameen Sangeet.

Works 
Source(s):
Meri Kavita Mere Geet (1969)
Tavi Te Chanhan (Rivers Tawi and Chenab, 1976)
Nheriyan Galiyan (Dark Lanes, 1982)
Pota Pota Nimbal (Fingertipful Cloudless Sky, 1987)
Uttar Vahini (1992)
Tainthian (1997).
Amrai (Hindi Interviews)
Diwankhana (Interviews)
Chith Chete (Memoirs)

Awards
Source(s):
Dinu Bhai Pant Life Time Achievement Award, 2017 by D.B. Pant Memorial Trust, Jammu, J&K
 Krutitava Smagra Samman, 2015 by Bharatiya Bhasha Parishad, West Bengal
 Saraswati Samman, 2015 for her autobiography "Chitt-Chete" in Dogri language
 Padma Shri Award. 2001
 Sahitya Akademi Award 1971
 Kabir Samman for poetry. 2007-08

Bibliography
 Naushin. Kitabghar, 1995.
 Main Kahti Hun Ankhin Dekhi (Travelogue). Bharatiya Gyanpith, 1995.
 *Bhatko nahin Dhananjay. Bharatiya Gyanpith, 1999. .
 Amrai. Rajkamal Prakashan, 2000. .
 Jammu Jo Kabhi Sahara Tha (Novel). Bharatiya Jnanpith, 2003. .
Phira kyā huā?, with Jnaneśvara, and Partha Senagupta. National Book Trust, 2007. .

Translations
 Where Has My Gulla Gone (Anthology). Prabhat Prakashan, 2009. .
 A Drop in the Ocean: An Autobiography. tr. by Uma Vasudev, Jyotsna Singh. National Book Trust, India, 2011. .

See also
 List of Indian writers
 List of Indian poets

References

Further reading

External links
 Mother of Modern Dogri Poetry: A Literary Profile of Padma Sachdev

1940 births
2021 deaths
People from Jammu (city)
20th-century Indian poets
20th-century Indian novelists
Dogri language
Hindi-language writers
Indian women novelists
Indian autobiographers
Indian women non-fiction writers
Recipients of the Padma Shri in literature & education
Recipients of the Sahitya Akademi Award in Hindi
Indian women poets
Women autobiographers
Poets from Jammu and Kashmir
Women writers from Jammu and Kashmir
20th-century Indian women writers
21st-century Indian women writers
21st-century Indian novelists
Novelists from Jammu and Kashmir
Recipients of the Sahitya Akademi Prize for Translation
Recipients of the Sahitya Akademi Award in Dogri